Chalcoela is a genus of moths of the family Crambidae.

Species
Chalcoela iphitalis (Walker, 1859)
Chalcoela pegasalis (Walker, 1859)

References

External links 

Glaphyriinae
Crambidae genera
Taxa named by Philipp Christoph Zeller